Nungba (originally "Lwangba") is a small town surrounded by a low-lying hill ranges and rivers, an extension of eastern Indian Himalayas. The highest point of Nungba "Ramphaan But" which means "Viewpoint" stands high at the centre of the town.

Nungba is also the administrative Headquarter of Nungba Sub-Division, Tamenglong District, Manipur State, India.

Nungba has a number of educational institutions including, Nungba Government High School, St. John English High School, and Maranatha Academy. It also houses Nungba Government Hospital(Community Health Center) and clinics.

Nungba Bazar is famous for King Chilly (The World's Hottest Chilly), local oranges, wild herbs and fermented bamboo shoots.

It is connected by roadways (NH 53 Passing through Nungba from Imphal to Jiri). The soon coming under- construction Indian Railway station is an hour drive away from Nungba.

Demographics

Population
According to 2011 Census, Nungba has a population of approximately 2200 from more than 350 household. The latest awaited Census report of 2015-16 is expected for more growth. Inhabitant here is Rongmei Naga Tribe. "Rongmei" is the main spoken language followed by English, Manipuri and Hindi.

Religion
The whole population of Nungba practice Christianity (Baptist, Presbyterian, Roman Catholic, Seventh Day Adventist, Assembly of Yaweh).

Administration/Office
Sub-Divisional Magistrate, Sub-Divisional Police Officer, Post Master, Chief Medical Officer functions from their respective offices headquartered in Nungba.

Geography 
Nungba is located on the eastern end of Indian Himalayas with an area of approximately 120 Sq. km. It lies on the India's highest Seismicity zone V. The latest seismic activity of 6.7 magnitude was recorded on early morning of 3 January 2016, with an epicenter 50 km from Nungba.

Physiography
Hills and rivers marks as the boundary of Nungba. It is marked by a steep slope at the East and gently elongated more towards West and South.

Nungba is closely surrounded by several other small hill towns namely - Rwangdai, Rengpang, Taodaijang, Mukti, Namgaylung(known as Mukti naa), Tajeikaiphun and Puiluan. The rivers that flows out and surround Nungba includes river Lemga, Khatha, Thingdingluangthuak and Luangphai. Other rivers that mark as a natural boundaries includes Alang (Irang), Agu (Barak).

Climate
Nungba has a sub-tropical highland climate. It experience a pleasant and comfortable climatic conditions throughout the year with temperature ranging between 5-20 degree Celsius during winter and 15-30 degree Celsius during summer. The scenic town spreads along several hillocks.

Rainfall
Nungba town receives approx. 1100 millimeters annually. The rain bearing South West Monsoon brings shower from the month of April/May till August/September, a boon for agriculture.

Monsoon season is accompanied by frequent landslides along the National Highway 53 hindering flow of traffic sometime.

Flora and fauna
The forest reserves in Nungba offers the local populace to practice a Jhum (Shifting) cultivation. Primary agricultural product includes Rice, Colocasia roots, Hot Red King Chilly,  Maize, Cucumber,  Ladies Finger, Mustards, Cabbage, Beans and other vegetables. Different kinds of fruits grown and produces includes Orange, Lemon, Banana, Grapes, Mango, Pine apples, Berries etc.

The huge forest covers includes Bamboos, Oaks and other large tropical trees which in turn provides a fresh water, fresh air and other forest resources. The forest woods are also used as a fuel for kitchen.

Different  Animals and Birds includes Tiger (hardly spotted) Bear, Wild dogs, Wild Pigs, Deer, Monkey, Squirrel, Bulbul, Sparrow, Parrot, Crow, Eagle etc. The fresh river water is blessed with variety of fishes whose name are locally known.

Nungba is located at an elevation of 400 m from MSL.

Economy

More than 70% engaged in Agricultural activities. While the remaining 30% are engaged in Govt. Sectors and other private commercial activities. Taudaijang is a nearby village.

The latest discovery of  Fossil Fuels in and around Nungba promises better economic condition.

Location / Connectivity 
Located in Tamenglong District, National Highway 37 passes through Nungba. It is 110 km from Imphal (Capital City of Manipur). The under-construction India Railway station is just an hour distance from Nungba.

Nearest Airport is Tulihal International Airport Imphal, 110 km away from Nungba.

References

External links
 Satellite map of Nungba
 Wikimapia
 Rongmei Naga

Cities and towns in Tamenglong district